Marwan Madarati  is a Syrian former footballer who played as a forward for Al-Jaish and the Syria national team.

References
Stats

Living people
Syrian footballers
Syria international footballers
Footballers at the 1980 Summer Olympics
Olympic footballers of Syria
1980 AFC Asian Cup players
1984 AFC Asian Cup players
1959 births
Place of birth missing (living people)
Footballers at the 1982 Asian Games
Association football forwards
Asian Games competitors for Syria
Syrian Premier League players